William Cornforth Robinson (12 July 1861 – 11 June 1931) was a British Labour Member of Parliament. Born in Carlton, West Riding of Yorkshire, he began work at the age of ten in a mill in Burnley. At the age of 17 he organised a trade union after experiencing a 20-week-long strike. By 1894 he had become the general secretary of the Amalgamated Association of Beamers, Twisters and Drawers, a position he held to the end of his life. He was president of the United Textile Factory Workers Association from 1913 to 1919. For many years he was a member of the Labour Party National Executive.

In 1911 and 1918 he ran for election at Oldham, and again in 1920 in Ashton-under-Lyne. He was elected at Elland in 1922 but lost the seat in 1923. He won it again in 1924 and held it until 1929.

References

 The Times, obituary of William Cornforth Robinson, 12 June 1931
Hansard: Contributions by William Cornforth Robinson in the British House of Commons

External links 
 

1861 births
1931 deaths
Labour Party (UK) MPs for English constituencies
UK MPs 1922–1923
UK MPs 1924–1929
People from Rothwell, West Yorkshire
Presidents of the United Textile Factory Workers' Association
Textile workers
Chairs of the Labour Party (UK)
United Textile Factory Workers' Association-sponsored MPs